The Vineyard is a cricket ground in Dublin, Ireland. In local domestic cricket, the ground is the home of The Hills Cricket Club. The first recorded match on the ground was in 1992, when Munster played North Leinster.  In 2005, the ground hosted two List A matches in the 2005 ICC Trophy.  The first of these saw Bermuda play Scotland, which resulted in a Scottish victory by 6 wickets.  The second of these saw Denmark play Namibia, which resulted 103 run victory for Namibia.  

In 2006, the ground hosted a Women's One Day Internationals between Ireland women and India women, which India women won by 78 runs.  In 2009, it hosted another Women's One Day International between Ireland women and the Netherlands women, which Ireland women won by 10 wickets.  Also in 2009, the ground held a Women's Twenty20 International between Ireland women and Pakistan women, which Ireland women won by 9 wickets.

The ground held a first-class match between Ireland and Afghanistan in the 2011–13 Intercontinental Cup.

References

External links

Cricket grounds in the Republic of Ireland
Sports venues in Dublin (city)
Sports venues completed in 1992
Cricket grounds in County Dublin